Marius Chelaru (born 2 March 1997) is a Romanian professional footballer who plays as a midfielder.

Club career

Politehnica Iași 
In the summer of 2017, after helping CS Știința Miroslava secure promotion to the Romanian Liga II, Chelaru returned to Politehnica Iași, and subsequently signed a new contract that will keep him at the team until the summer of 2020.

Helped by the fact that Liga I teams had to play a home grown youth player, Chelaru established himself as a starter under manager Flavius Stoican, in the 2017–18 season.

Career statistics

Club

Honours

Știința Miroslava
Liga III: 2016–17

References

External links
 
 

1997 births
Living people
Romanian footballers
Association football midfielders
Liga I players
Liga II players
FC Politehnica Iași (2010) players
CS Știința Miroslava players
CS Aerostar Bacău players
Sportspeople from Iași